The Long Island Traction Company was a street railway holding company in Brooklyn and Queens, New York City, United States.

History 
In order to get around anti-stock watering statutes, the owners of the Brooklyn City Rail Road, capitalized at $6 million, incorporated the Long Island Traction Company in West Virginia in March 1893 with a capital of $30 million. The BCRR-controlled Brooklyn Heights Railroad, until then the operator of only the short cable-operated Montague Street Line, leased the BCRR on June 6, 1893. The Long Island Traction Company acquired the Broadway Railroad by May 1893, and incorporated the Brooklyn, Queens County and Suburban Railroad on November 24, 1893 to take it over, as well as the Broadway Ferry and Metropolitan Avenue Railroad and Jamaica and Brooklyn Railroad. The increased capitalization was used to convert the companies from horse car to trolley operations.

The Long Island Traction Company went bankrupt in mid-1895 after a January strike. The Brooklyn Rapid Transit Company was incorporated January 18, 1896, and took over the LI Traction Company in early February.

Controlled lines
From the Brooklyn City Rail Road
Annex Line
Bowery Bay Line
Bushwick Line
Calvary Cemetery Line
Corona Line
Court Street Line
Crosstown Line
Cypress Hills Line
Flatbush Avenue Line
Flushing Avenue Line
Fulton Street Line
Furman Street Line
Gates Avenue Line
Grand Street Line
Greenpoint Line
Hamilton Avenue Line
Holy Cross Line
Lorimer Street Line
Lutheran Cemetery Line
Meeker Avenue Line
Myrtle Avenue Line
Nostrand Avenue Line
Putnam Avenue Line
Richmond Hill Line
Second Avenue Line
Third Avenue Line
Tompkins Avenue Line
Union Avenue Line

From the Brooklyn Heights Railroad
Montague Street Line

From the Broadway Railroad
Broadway Line
Cypress Hills Line
Ralph Avenue Line
Reid Avenue Line
Sumner Avenue Line

From the Broadway Ferry and Metropolitan Avenue Railroad
Lutheran Cemetery Branch
Metropolitan Avenue Line

From the Jamaica and Brooklyn Railroad
Jamaica Line

References

Predecessors of the Brooklyn–Manhattan Transit Corporation
Streetcar lines in Brooklyn
Streetcar lines in Queens, New York
Defunct public transport operators in the United States
Defunct New York (state) railroads